Minuscule 904 (in the Gregory-Aland numbering), ε 4001 (von Soden), is a 14th-century Greek minuscule manuscript of the New Testament on paper. It has marginalia. The manuscript has survived in complete condition.

Description 

The codex contains the text of the four Gospels, on 376 paper leaves (size ), with some lacunae. The text is written in one column per page, 23 lines per page.

Text 
The Greek text of the codex is a representative of the Byzantine. Hermann von Soden classified it to the textual family Ik. Kurt Aland placed it in Category V.

According to the Claremont Profile Method it represents textual family Π in Luke 1 and Luke 10, as a weak member. In Luke 20 it represents textual family Kx.

History 

According to the colophon it was written in September 1360 by Theophylact. Currently the manuscript is dated by the INTF to the 14th century.

It was examined and described by Victor Gardthausen (as 952).

The manuscript was added to the list of New Testament manuscripts by Gregory (904e). It was not on the Scrivener's list, but it was added to his list by Edward Miller in the 4th edition of A Plain Introduction to the Criticism of the New Testament.

Jacob Greelings collated the text of the Gospel of Matthew and it was included in appendix A to work of S. Kubo.

It is not cited in critical editions of the Greek New Testament (UBS4, NA28).

The manuscript is housed at the Greek Orthodox Patriarchate of Alexandria (77).

See also 

 List of New Testament minuscules (1–1000)
 Biblical manuscript
 Textual criticism
 Minuscule 903

References

Further reading 

 Sakae Kubo, 𝔓 72 and the Codex Vaticanus, Studies and Documents 27 (Salt Lake City: University of Utah Press, 1965), pp. 161-196.

External links 
 

Greek New Testament minuscules
14th-century biblical manuscripts